Ślęża Landscape Park (Ślężański Park Krajobrazowy) is a protected area (Landscape Park) in south-western Poland, established in 1988, covering an area of . It takes its name from that of Mount Ślęża.

The Park lies within Lower Silesian Voivodeship: in Dzierżoniów County (Gmina Dzierżoniów, Gmina Łagiewniki), Świdnica County (Gmina Marcinowice, Gmina Świdnica) and Wrocław County (Gmina Jordanów Śląski, Gmina Sobótka).

Within the Landscape Park are five nature reserves.

References 

Landscape parks in Poland
Parks in Lower Silesian Voivodeship